Upptalk (formerly known as Yuilop) was a proprietary voice-over-IP service and software application that provided mobile phone numbers in the cloud and allows users to call or text any phone for free whether or not the device receiving the calls and texts has the Yuilop application. The service was discontinued in 2017 and even its domain was abandoned.

Yuilop provided phone numbers can be accessed across any device on the internet (IP) and are reachable via regular phone calls (PSTN) from any landline or mobile phone, and SMS.  Calls and chats to other users within the yuilop network service are free of charge.  Unlike most other VoIP services, yuilop does not charge for off network communication. Calls and SMS to landline telephones and mobile phones use virtual credits that are earned for free through participating in promotional activities and using the app. Yuilop does not require credit for national calls and SMS in the U.S. Yuilop has additional features, including instant messaging, group chat, and location, and photo sharing. Competitors include Skype, Viber and Google Voice.

Overview 
Yuilop was created by former simyo CEO, Jochen Doppelhammer in November 2010.  Yuilop's headquarters are located in Barcelona, Spain  and the app is available in over 200 countries including the United States, United Kingdom, Germany, Italy, Spain, Israel, and Mexico.

The app had approximately 5 million users and is available on Android, iOS, Windows Phone, BlackBerry OS.

As of July 2013, Yuilop has raised approximately $9 million in funding from investors such as Nauta Capital, Shortcut Ventures GmbH, Bright Capital, and the Spanish government.

In 2014, the company UppTalk entered insolvency procedures.

Yuilop's services are split into two main categories: 
Calls and texts made to other Yuilop users using VoIP.
Calls and SMS made to mobile phones and landlines and virtual numbers like Skype and Google Voice by connecting to the Public Switched Telephone Network (PSTN).

Features 
Yuilop provides free calling and texting between Yuilop users as well as to mobile and landline numbers not in the Yuilop network.  Yuilop allows these registered users to communicate through instant messaging, SMS, voice chat, and calling with yuilop.me.  Yuilop's text chat client allows group chats, emoticons, photo sharing, and location sharing.

Yuilop.me 
Yuilop.me is an option to receive a virtual mobile phone number. The number can be used across devices with access to the internet and is not tied to a SIM card or an operator. Yuilop.me is currently available to Yuilop users in the United States, the United Kingdom, Germany and Spain.

Credits 
Calls and instant messages made to other Yuilop users via the app are free and unlimited.  Calls and SMS made to mobile phones and land lines use "credits".  Credits are acquired by:
Inviting friends and having them sign up to become users of Yuilop.
Completing an online offer such as downloading apps, filling out a survey, shopping, or signing up for a trial period of a listed product.
Redeeming voucher codes shared on Yuilop's Facebook and Twitter accounts.
Using the app, i.e. receiving chats from other Yuilop users, receiving calls, and receiving SMS to a yuilop.me number.

Version 1.9 of the iOS app also allows users to purchase credits.

The number of credits used to call mobile phone and land lines is determined by the location to which the call or SMS is sent.  Sending calls or SMS to mobile phones requires no credit in or between some countries, such as the United States.

Security
Yuilop used a 2048 bit encryption to encrypt data traffic and call signalling over any transport medium (Wi-Fi, 2G, 3G, 4G LTE).  A STARTTLS extension is used through a Transport Layer Security protocol.

See also 

 Comparison of instant messaging clients
 Comparison of VoIP software
 Mobile VoIP
 Presence information
 Secure communication
 Unified communications

References

External links 
 

2011 software
Android (operating system) software
Cross-platform mobile software
Cross-platform software
Freeware
Instant messaging clients
IOS software
Portable software
VoIP services
VoIP companies of Spain
VoIP software
Windows Phone software
Defunct instant messaging clients